Anne of Green Gables is a 1985 Canadian made-for-television drama film based on the 1908 novel of the same name by Canadian author Lucy Maud Montgomery, and is the first in a series of four films. The film stars Megan Follows in the title role of Anne Shirley and was produced and directed by Kevin Sullivan for the Canadian Broadcasting Corporation. It was released theatrically in Iran, Israel, Europe, and Japan.

The film aired on CBC Television as a two-part mini-series on December 1 and December 2, 1985. Both parts of the film were among the highest-rated programs of any genre ever to air on a Canadian television network. On February 17, 1986, the film aired on PBS in the US on the series WonderWorks. The film achieved high ratings in the United Kingdom when it aired on New Year’s Day 1987.

Plot
13-year-old orphan Anne Shirley is living in servitude with the cruel Hammond family in Nova Scotia. After Mr. Hammond dies, she is sent back to the orphanage and later learns that she has been adopted by a family in Prince Edward Island. Upon arriving in the small town of Avonlea, she is met at the train station by the elderly Matthew Cuthbert, who is surprised to find her there. Matthew and his sister Marilla had requested a boy to help them on their farm, Green Gables, but Anne was sent by mistake.

Marilla puts Anne "on trial" before deciding whether to keep her or send her back. Shortly thereafter, Anne loses her temper with Marilla's friend and town gossip Rachel Lynde, who criticizes her looks and red hair. She refuses to apologize, preferring to go back to the orphanage, but Matthew convinces her to do so. Rachel accepts the apology and suggests to Marilla that Anne attend a Sunday School picnic so she can meet other children. At the picnic, Anne becomes "bosom" friends with Diana Barry from across the pond. She also meets Gilbert Blythe, who shows an interest in her. At school, Gilbert tries to get her attention by making fun of her red hair and calling her "Carrots", and she angrily smashes a slate over his head. She vows never to forgive him and tries to salvage her wounded pride by dying her hair black, but it instead turns green. After finding out what happened, Marilla decides that Anne will stay at Green Gables.

Anne invites Diana to a tea party, where she accidentally serves currant wine instead of raspberry cordial and gets Diana drunk. Mrs. Barry thinks it was intentional and forbids the girls from seeing each other again. Meanwhile, Miss Muriel Stacey becomes the new Avonlea schoolteacher. She wants Anne to join a special class for students who plan to take the entrance exam for Queen's Academy in Charlottetown.

While Marilla is away, Diana arrives in a panic and tells Anne and Matthew that her little sister Minnie May is sick with croup. Anne treats the girl with ipecac and saves her life. Mrs. Barry is grateful and invites Anne to a Christmas ball in Carmody overnight. Anne sees Gilbert at the dance but is not willing to befriend him. She also meets Josephine Barry, who invites her and Diana to visit her mansion in Charlottetown, where Anne takes the Queen's entrance exam.

Back in Avonlea, Anne and her friends recreate Alfred Tennyson's The Lady of Shalott, with Anne playing the role of Elaine the Lily Maid. While floating down the river, her boat springs a leak and sinks, leaving her helplessly clinging to a bridge. Gilbert comes rowing by and rescues her, then tells her they have tied for first place on the exam. He also asks her to forgive him for what he said before and insists he wants to be her friend, but Anne is still hesitant.

Anne heads to Charlottetown to continue her education at Queen's and obtain a teacher's license. She finds out that the graduate who receives the highest mark in English literature wins the Avery scholarship, $250 for four years, which she plans to use to get an arts degree at Redmond College. When the results come in, she is the winner of the scholarship. Returning to Avonlea, she finds out that Gilbert's father cannot afford to send him to college, so he will be teaching at the Avonlea school to earn his way. After Matthew dies, Marilla considers selling Green Gables since her eyesight is failing and she may go blind. However, Anne reveals that she has declined the scholarship. Instead of going to Redmond, she will study by correspondence while teaching school in Carmody. Marilla reveals that Gilbert's father was an old beau with whom she quarreled, and she wishes she had forgiven him when she had the chance. Later, Gilbert explains that he asked the trustees to let Anne have the Avonlea school and give Carmody to him, so Anne can stay at Green Gables and help Marilla. He will also be taking courses by correspondence and asks for Anne's help in studying. The two friends make up for good and Gilbert walks Anne home.

Cast

 Megan Follows – Anne Shirley
 Colleen Dewhurst – Marilla Cuthbert
 Richard Farnsworth – Matthew Cuthbert
 Patricia Hamilton – Rachel Lynde
 Marilyn Lightstone – Miss Stacy
 Schuyler Grant – Diana Barry
 Jonathan Crombie – Gilbert Blythe
 Charmion King – Aunt Josephine Barry
 Jackie Burroughs – Amelia Evans
 Rosemary Radcliffe – Mrs. Barry
 Joachim Hansen – John Sadler
 Christiane Krüger – Mrs. Allan
 Cedric Smith – Rev. Allan
 Paul Brown – Mr. Phillips
 Miranda de Pencier – Josie Pye
 Trish Nettleton – Jane Andrews
 Jennifer Inch – Ruby Gillis
 Jayne Eastwood – Mrs. Hammond
 Dawn Greenhalgh – Mrs. Cadbury
 Jack Mather – Station Master
 Samantha Langevin – Mrs. Blewett
 Vivian Reis – Mrs. Spencer
 Mag Ruffman – Alice Lawson
 Sean McCann – Dr. O'Reilly
 Roxolana Roslak – Madame Selitsky
 Robert Haley – Professor
 Robert Collins – Mr. Barry
 Morgan Chapman – Minne May Barry
 David Roberts – Tom
 Nancy Beatty – Essie
 David Hughes – Thomas Lynde
 Wendy Lyon – Prissy Andrews
 Zack Ward – Moody Spurgeon MacPherson
 Anna Ferguson – Punch Woman
 Rex Southgate – Section Head
 Julianna Saxton – Pink Woman
 Molly Thom – Lace Woman
 Jennifer Irwin – Student
 Sandra Scott – Mrs. Harrington
 Peter Sturgess – Porter
 Ray Ireland – Mr. Hammond
 Martha Maloney – Fairview Nurse
 Stuart Hamilton – Mme. Selitsky's Accompanist

Production
Kevin Sullivan adapted the novel into his own screenplay, collaborating with industry veteran Joe Wiesenfeld. Sullivan developed a co-production between the CBC and PBS in order to film Anne of Green Gables. Sullivan amalgamated many of Montgomery's episodes into the film's plot. While the film diverged from Montgomery's original, he relied on strong characterizations and visuals in order to render the story for a contemporary audience. The script also borrows ideas from the 1934 film version.

Primary locations for filming the movie included Prince Edward Island; Stouffville, Ontario; Jacksons Point, Ontario; and Westfield Heritage Village near the Flamborough village of Rockton. Filming was done over a consecutive ten-week shoot. Sullivan used several locations as Green Gables farm and combined them to appear as one property.

The original film and sequels (including Road to Avonlea and the animated Anne films and series covering over 130 hours of production) have been seen in almost every country around the world. The films have now been translated and seen in more places than even the original novels.

During filming of the original movies an open casting call was held throughout Canada in order to find a young actress to play Anne Shirley. Katharine Hepburn recommended that her great niece, Schuyler Grant, play the role of Anne Shirley. Director Kevin Sullivan liked Grant's performance and wanted to give her the role. However, broadcast executives were resistant to cast an American as a Canadian icon. Schuyler Grant ended up playing Anne's best friend, Diana, and Anne Shirley was ultimately played by Megan Follows.

In her first audition, Megan Follows came highly recommended, but she was quickly dismissed by Kevin Sullivan. For her second audition, after a turbulent morning leading up to her audition, a frantic Megan made a much better impression and was given the role.

Sequels and spin-off TV series

Film series

In 1987, Anne of Green Gables: The Sequel (also called Anne of Avonlea) was released. The sequel is a conglomeration of Anne of Avonlea, Anne of the Island, and Anne of Windy Poplars. The third movie, Anne of Green Gables: The Continuing Story, was aired on March 5, 2000 in Canada and on July 23, 2000 in the United States. Due to the spin-off television series Road to Avonlea creating a different timeline from the books, The Continuing Story passed over Anne's House of Dreams – the corresponding Anne novel – in favor of an original story not featured in Montgomery's series. In 2008, the fourth in the series, Anne of Green Gables: A New Beginning was completed. Both a sequel and a prequel, the film starred Barbara Hershey (replacing Megan Follows), Shirley MacLaine, and Rachel Blanchard, and introduced Hannah Endicott-Douglas as young Anne Shirley.

Spin-off series
The first two Anne films generated the spin-off television series Road to Avonlea (1990-1996), starring Sarah Polley. The show explored the lives of residents in the town of Avonlea, drawing inspiration from Montgomery's work beyond the Anne books. The main characters and early episodes were inspired by The Story Girl and The Golden Road, with many other episodes based on short stories from Chronicles of Avonlea and Further Chronicles of Avonlea. Anne did not appear, but other characters, including Gilbert, Marilla, Rachel Lynde, and Miss Stacy, played supporting parts with the same actors reprising their roles. Jackie Burroughs, Cedric Smith, and Mag Ruffman returned as main cast members, but in different roles than the original films.

In 1998, the reunion television special An Avonlea Christmas aired, set in Avonlea during World War I.

Other productions
From 2000 until 2001, Sullivan Animation produced Anne of Green Gables: The Animated Series consisting of 26 half-hour episodes. The series was developed for PBS and each episode contained an educational and/or moral component. In 2005, Sullivan Animation also produced the feature-length animated film Anne: Journey to Green Gables which is an imaginative, whimsical prequel to Sullivan's live action Anne of Green Gables film.

A year after the mini-series originally aired, Canadian comedy duo Wayne and Shuster created and starred in a parody entitled Sam of Green Gables, in which a curmudgeonly old man named Sam is sent to Green Gables instead of Anne.

Awards and nominations
The film swept the 1986 Gemini Awards, winning the following:
Best Dramatic Miniseries
Best Actress in a Single Dramatic Program or Miniseries: Megan Follows
Best Supporting Actor: Richard Farnsworth
Best Supporting Actress: Colleen Dewhurst
Best Writing (TV Adaptation): Kevin Sullivan and Joe Wiesenfeld
Best Music Composition: Hagood Hardy
Best Costume Design: Martha Mann
Best Photography: René Ohashi
Best Production Design/Art Direction: Carol Spier
Most Popular Program

The film was also nominated for Best Direction in a Dramatic Program or Mini-Series and Best Picture Editing in a Dramatic Program or Series.

The series also won an Emmy Award in 1986, for Outstanding Children's Program.

Other Awards
 Peabody Award – to Kevin Sullivan for Outstanding Contribution to Broadcasting in the United States, 1986
Prix Jeunesse: Best Drama, 1988 (Germany)
TV Guide Award: Most Popular Program, 1986
Grand Award – International Film and Television, New York
Emily Award – American Film and Video Festival, 1986
Macleans Medal of Merit – Maclean's Magazine, 1986
Chris Award – Columbus International Film Festival, 1986
Silver Hugo Award – Chicago International Film Festival, 1986
International TV Movie Festival: Nomination for Movie of the Year, 1986
American TV Critics Award: Best Drama, 1986
Grant Award: Best TV Program, Houston International Film Festival, 1987
Golden Gate Award – San Francisco Film Festival, 1986
CRTA Award: Outstanding Personal Achievement in TV, 1986
Ohio State Award – Performing Arts and Humanities Award, 1987
First Prize – Odyssey Institute Media Award, 1987
The Ruby Slipper: Best Television Special, 1987
Parents Choice Award – Parents Choice for TV Programmings, 1987
Excellence in Programming – Award from Association of Catholic Communications in Canada, 1987
Golden Apple Award – Best of National Educational Film and Video Festival, 1987

Home media
The Anne of Green Gables series was released on DVD in a collector's edition set on February 5, 2008 in the US, April 29, 2008 in Canada and Japan and on September 22, 2010 in Hungary. The set is the most comprehensive edition of all three movies ever released. In addition to the series, it also includes several DVD extras such as feature length commentary from director Kevin Sullivan and Stefan Scaini, 2 New Documentaries: L.M. Montgomery's Island and Kevin Sullivan's Classic featuring new cast and crew interviews, missing scenes, lost footage and a condensed, 10-minute version of the missing "Road to Avonlea" episode "Marilla Cuthbert's Death".

In 2016, Sullivan Entertainment announced it would launch their own streaming service called Gazebo TV that would feature the Anne of Green Gables series among other titles produced by the company. The service launched in early 2017.

Lawsuits
In 1908, Lucy Maud Montgomery signed a contract with the L.C. Page & Company publishing house in Boston that permitted them to publish all of her books for 5 years on the same terms: the main terms were a 10% royalty and world rights to all of the author's books; plus it also included the right to publish all of her future works. The relationship with Pageant actually spanned nearly ten years and resulted in the publication of nine novels and collections of short stories. However, when Montgomery contracted with a Canadian publisher (McClelland, Goodchild and Stewart), L.C. Page claimed that they had the exclusive rights to her new books and threatened to sue her. Montgomery instead took L.C. Page to court to recover withheld royalties.

The lawsuit resulted in a settlement in 1919 whereby L.C. Page bought out all of Montgomery's rights to all of her novels published by them. The settlement excluded any reversionary rights that might become due for the benefit of either her or her heirs if such rights were to become enacted.C21 report on court case The settlement paid Montgomery a flat sum of $18,000; at the time an amount she would have expected to see earned from her works during her lifetime.

Sullivan purchased dramatic rights from Montgomery's heirs in 1984, believing that they owned reversionary rights that had come into place as a result of changes to the copyright act subsequent to Montgomery's death.

After Sullivan's films were successful around the world and brought legions of tourists to Prince Edward Island, the Montgomery heirs established an Anne of Green Gables Licensing Authority with the Province of Prince Edward Island to control trademarks to preserve Montgomery's works, through the mechanism of official trademarks. The heirs and the AGGLA became successful at asserting control over the booming Anne-themed tourist industry that the province enjoyed, because of the lack of clarity about the different protections afforded by copyright, trademark and official marks in Canada.

AGGLA and the heirs tried to assert control over trademarks Sullivan had established to their various Anne movies (Anne of Green Gables, Anne of Avonlea, Anne of Green Gables—the Continuing Story) and Road to Avonlea properties both in Canada, the US and Japan.

A Japanese court then determined that the heirs were not entitled to the reversionary rights that they claimed they had sold to Sullivan and that the AGGLA was set up for pursuing private interests and not for serving public interests such as maintaining or managing the value, fame or reputation of the literary work, the author or even the main character of Anne. The Court determined that the AGGLA was the heirs' private profit-seeking enterprise as far as its activities were concerned.

Sullivan and the heirs came into further conflict during the 1990s. Sullivan was sued by the heirs. Their contractual agreement with Sullivan said that he would pay them a flat $425,000 (CAD) fee for the right to adapt the first book (and another $100,000 to do the second movie, Anne of Avonlea), plus 10% of the profits of Anne 1 and 5% of the profits of Anne 2. The contract also gave them the right to examine Sullivan Entertainment's financial records. However, when Sullivan claimed that neither of the movies had earned a net profit and (the heirs assert) refused to allow them to audit his books, they served a claim against him. Sullivan argued that the heirs and the AGGLA had enjoined the films by usurping the Sullivan trademarks and drastically reduced the profitability of the ventures.
The heirs staged a press conference in 1998 at exactly the time when Sullivan was about to close a public offering to take his company public, to force Sullivan to pay them further receipts. The offering however was pulled by the underwriters and Sullivan counter-sued for libel, insisting that the heirs should pay damages of $55 million to all parties involved.
A Superior Court of Ontario judge dismissed his suit on January 19, 2004.Sullivan Entertainment Group Inc. v. MacDonald Butler, 2004 CanLII 8939 (ON S.C.)
The Montgomery heirs subsequently dropped their claim for Sullivan to pay them any royalties. However, a settlement between Sullivan, the Montgomery heirs and the AGGLA was reached in 2006 to deal with all of their outstanding disagreements.
Although Kevin Sullivan's works were initially based upon the works of Montgomery, Sullivan developed most of his successful Anne-related film properties (Anne of Avonlea, Anne -the Continuing Story, Anne – A New Beginning and Road to Avonlea) based on original material, not directly adapted from Montgomery's books. Many questions have been raised in court as to the author's heirs' rights in her copyright. The heirs have tried to extend the copyright in Montgomery's unpublished works until 2017 but lost that opportunity in 2004 when the Canadian Parliament rejected the provision they had pursued so ardently for the unpublished works of dead authors.
In a Japanese court decision which addressed the heirs' challenge to the validity of Sullivan's ownership of Japanese trademark's in the movie property, the Japanese High Court commented on the heirs' entitlement to reversionary copyright which formed the basis of the rights that the family claimed to have sold to Sullivan. The Court stated that the heirs' reversionary copyright was non-existent and that there was no need for Sullivan or any other entity to account to the heirs for the use of the trademark in Japan.

The Court stated: "It is not clear from a legal point of view why permission from the heirs of the author or its related entity the Anne of Green Gables Licensing (AGGLA) authority was necessary."

The Japanese Court also extensively scrutinized whether the copyright in the book Anne of Green Gables had ever devolved to the heirs and called for extensive filing of evidence on this point. Sullivan filed an original 1919 agreement between Montgomery and L.C. Page & Co. which specifically excluded the heirs' reversionary claims. Montgomery sold all of her publishing and copyright to her series of novels, in perpetuity, to her original American publisher in 1919, to the exclusion of her heirs.

The Court further questioned whether the heirs' licensing authority was engaged in activities of sufficient public interest as to qualify as a controlling body of Montgomery's works. The Court stated: "...the possibility cannot be denied that the Anne of Green Gables Licensing Authority is the heirs' private profit-seeking enterprise as far as the activities with which the heirs of the subject case are involved are concerned. It is not proved from the evidence submitted in the subject case that the Anne of Green Gables Licensing Authority is involved in activities of public interest that are sufficient for the Anne of Green Gables Licensing Authority to be qualified as the owner of the registration of the subject mark as a controlling body of the subject literary work."

Trademark and copyright
After recent speculation as to who owned the copyrights and trademarks concerning Anne of Green Gables today, there are principally two entities that control rights relating to Anne of Green Gables. The Anne of Green Gables Licensing Authority (AGGLA – which includes Lucy Maud Montgomery's heirs and the Province of Prince Edward Island) and Sullivan Entertainment (the producers of the well-known films and TV series based on Montgomery's novels).

The Anne of Green Gables Licensing Authority controls certain exclusive trademarks relating to Anne of Green Gables commercial merchandise and service related to Montgomery's literary works and any copyright in the Montgomery books which have not reverted to the public domain.

Sullivan Entertainment Inc, under agreement with the Anne of Green Gables Licensing Authority, retains all of the dramatic copyright and motion picture copyright in over 125 hours of their original movies, mini-series and television series based on both the Anne and Avonlea series of novels and certain trade-marks relating to Sullivan sourced Anne of Green Gables merchandise and services. Sullivan's use of the Anne of Green Gables trademarks extends from motion picture products and books, DVDs, CDs etc. to all commercial merchandise related to Sullivan's films and television series based on their visual images, costume and production designs, settings, themes and original characters. Sullivan Entertainment also solely controls the commercial trademarks to Anne of Avonlea, Anne of the Island, and Road to Avonlea.

References

External links
 The L.M. Montgomery Literary Society This site includes information about Montgomery's actual works (not reinterpreted), her life, and new research in the newsletter, The Shining Scroll''.
 The Official Anne of Green Gables Movie Website – The official website of Sullivan series of Anne of Green Gables movies
 Watch Anne of Green Gables online – The official Streaming Platform for Anne of Green Gables movies
 Sullivan Entertainment Website – The Official website of Sullivan Entertainment. Includes a wealth of information on the Anne movies and its spinoffs
 Road to Avonlea Website – The official website for Road to Avonlea, the spinoff to the Green Gables series of movies
 L.M. Montgomery Online This scholarly site includes a blog, a bibliography of reference materials, and a complete filmography of all adaptations of Montgomery texts. See, in particular, the page for Anne of Green Gables.
 The Anne Shirley Homepage – A great resource for all Anne fans with galleries, fan art, timelines, recipes and calendars.
 An L.M. Montgomery Resource Page – excellent resource on L.M. Montgomery and her legacy in film and television
 
 
 Anne of Green Gables Centenary – This site includes information about the centenary anniversary of Lucy Maud Montgomery's Anne of Green Gables.

1985 television films
Anne of Green Gables films
1980s Canadian television miniseries
English-language Canadian films
Gemini and Canadian Screen Award for Best Television Film or Miniseries winners
CBC Television original films
Canadian drama television films
Films directed by Kevin Sullivan
1980s Canadian films